Dodi, Dodie or Dody is a given name of various origins, used for both men and women. When used as a feminine name, it may be a diminutive for Dolores or Dorothy.

People

Doddie
 Doddie Weir (born George Weir, 4 July 1970), Scottish rugby union player

Dodi
 Dodi Fayed (1955–1997), Egyptian multi-millionaire and film producer
 Dodi Gago (born 1956), nickname of Gagik Tsarukyan, Armenian politician and businessman
 Dodi Protero (1931–2007), Canadian operatic singer

Dodie
 Dodie (born 1995), English singer-songwriter, author, and YouTuber
 Dodie Bellamy, American novelist and journalist
 Dodie Heath (born 1926), American actress
 Dodie Horton, American politician
 Dodie Kazanjian (born 1952), American writer specializing in the arts
 Dodie McGuinness (born 1950), Irish politician
 Dodie Boy Peñalosa (born 1962), Filipino boxer
 Dodie Post (1922–2012), American alpine skier
 Dodie Smith (1896–1990), English novelist and playwright
 Dodie Stevens (born 1946), American pop singer

Dody
 Dody Crane, Canadian politician
 Dody Dorn (born 1955), American film and sound editor
 Dody Goodman (1914–2008), American character actress
 Dody Roach (1937–2004), American poker player
 Dody Weston Thompson (1923–2012), American photographer and historian of photography
 Dody Wood (born 1972), Canadian ice hockey player

Fictional characters
 Deirdre Hortense "Dodie" Bishop, in the American animated television series As Told by Ginger
 Dorothy "Dodie" Harper Douglas, in the American television series My Three Sons

See also
Doddy (disambiguation), includes a list of people with the nickname
Dod (nickname)

Lists of people by nickname